Laberweinting is a municipality in the district of Straubing-Bogen in Bavaria, Germany.

Geography 
The Große Laaber and the Kleine Laber, the Bayerbach and the Grafentraubach flow through the Laberweinting.

Subdivisions 
The municipality Laberweinting consists of 31 villages

Main sights
Schloss Grafentraubach (built 1507)
Church of Saint Martin  (built 1679/1681)
Church of Saint Nicholas  (built 1869)

See also
Ginhart

References

External links

Straubing-Bogen